Bashundhara Group is a Bangladeshi conglomerate. It is one of the largest manufacturing companies in Bangladesh. It was incorporated in 1987 as a real estate company venture under the name East West Property Development Ltd (EWPD). The first project of EWPD turned out to be very successful. After then, the company grew very quickly. It presently owns more than 50 major concerns located throughout Bangladesh.

History 
Bashundhara Group (Ahmed Akbar Sobhan, is the founder and chairman of Bashundhara Group.) began in 1987 as real estate venture. After its first successful project, Bashundhara invested in new fields, including manufacturing, industry and trading. More enterprises were established in the early 1990s; these included cement, paper, pulp, tissue paper and steel production, as well as LP Gas bottling and distribution. On 4 February 2014, The Bangladesh Supreme Court ordered Bashundhara Group officials to surrender before it on a tax evasion case filed by the caretaker government. On 19 December 2011, Sobhan was sued for 'fraud' by Mohammad Shahjahan over the price of land in Bashundhara. Bashundhara received permission from Bangladesh Economic Zones Authority to set up two specialized economic zones in  Keraniganj, Dhaka, Bangladesh. In 2020, Bashundhara invested $143.7 million to build the largest bitumen plant in Bangladesh. This factory was intended to aid the country in becoming self-sufficient in bitumen production.

Enterprises 
Bashundhara Group now operates over 50 concerns:
 East West Property Development (Pvt) Limited
 Meghna Cement Mills Limited
Bashundhara Shipping Lines Limited
Bashundhara Shipping Limited
Bashundhara Logistics Limited
Bashundhara Horticulture Limited
Bashundhara Chemical Industries Limited
Bashundhara Trading Company Limited
Bashundhara International Trade Center Limited
Bashundhara Multi Trading Limited
Bashundhara General Trading LLC Dubai
Bashundhara Employment Services
Bashundhara Electricity Limited
Bashundhara Infrastructure Development Limited
Bashundhara Import Export Limited
Bashundhara Agricultural Products Limited
Bashundhara Multi Agricultural Company Limited
Bashundhara Multi Paper Industries Limited
Bashundhara Amusement Park Limited
Bashundhara Oil and Gas Company Limited
Bashundhara Multipurpose Port Limited
Bashundhara Textile Mills Limited
Bashundhara Airways Limited
Bashundhara Multi Food Products Limited
Bashundhara Technologies Limited
 Bashundhara Paper Mills Limited
Bashundhara Fine Paper Limited
Bashundhara Pulp & Board Mills Limited
 Bashundhara LP Gas Limited
 Bashundhara City Development Limited
 Bashundhara Steel Complex Limited
 Bashundhara Industrial Complex Limited
 Bashundhara Steel And Engineering Limited
 Bashundhara Multi Steel Industries
 Bashundhara Foundation
 Bashundhara Convention Center
 Bashundhara Dredging Company Limited
 Bashundhara Technical Institute
 Bashundhara Telecommunications Network Limited
 Bashundhara Food and Beverage Industries Limited
 Sundarban Industrial Complex Limited
 Bashundhara Cement Industries Limited
 Bashundhara Pre-Fabricated Building Manufacturing Industries
Dhaka Multi Agricultural Complex Limited
Sea Real Estate Developers Limited
 East West Media Group
 Bashundhara Kings
 Rangpur Riders
 Kebab Turki Baba Rafi (Bangladesh)
Toggi Services Limited
 T Sports
 Bir Cement Limited

Bashundhara City 

Bashundhara City is the second-largest shopping mall of Bangladesh. Construction of the shopping mall began in 1998; Mohammad Foyes Ullah and Mustapha Khalid Palash of Vistara designed the building. Opened to the public on 6 August 2004, the mall is located at Panthapath, near Karwan Bazar, in Dhaka city and cost over $100 million to complete. Bashundhara City is 21 stories tall, of which 8 are used for the mall, which houses hundreds of Bangladeshi fashion houses and jewelry shops, as well as around 100 food outlets which sell foods like French fries, burgers, fried chicken, etc.

Bashundhara Residential Area

Media house 

Bashundhara Group is expanding its business in various sectors started from real estate sector to steel industry. In 2009, they started a new enterprise, East West Media Group Ltd. It now owns four big media houses of Bangladesh; namely, two television channel, one FM radio station, one online newspaper and three other print media publications. Kaler Kantho and The Daily Bangladesh Pratidin are its Bengali national daily newspapers. The English newspaper is owns named Daily Sun.; The online newspaper is owns named banglanews24.com (Bengali, English);. News24, T-Sports is the Television channel of EWMG whereas Radio Capital is its only FM radio station.

See also
 List of companies of Bangladesh
 Bashundhara Kings
 Bashundhara Kings Women

References

Sources

 http://www.bangla2000.com/BusinessWorld/Company_Profile/Bashundhara/Bashundhara.shtm  Bashundhara Group Profile
 http://biz.prlog.org/BashundharaGroup/ Bashundhara Group PR
 http://www.slideshare.net/Bashundhara-Group/bashundhara-group-overview-11472622 Bashundhara Group Overview Slide
 https://www.jugantor.com/tech/258427/%E0%A6%B8%E0%A6%AE%E0%A6%BE%E0%A6%9C-%E0%A6%B0%E0%A6%BE%E0%A6%B7%E0%A7%8D%E0%A6%9F%E0%A7%8D%E0%A6%B0%E0%A6%95%E0%A7%87-%E0%A6%AA%E0%A7%8D%E0%A6%B0%E0%A6%AF%E0%A7%81%E0%A6%95%E0%A7%8D%E0%A6%A4%E0%A6%BF%E0%A6%B8%E0%A6%AE%E0%A7%83%E0%A6%A6%E0%A7%8D%E0%A6%A7-%E0%A6%95%E0%A6%B0%E0%A6%A4%E0%A7%87-%E0%A6%9A%E0%A6%BE%E0%A7%9F-%E0%A6%9F%E0%A6%97%E0%A6%BF-%E0%A6%B8%E0%A6%BE%E0%A6%B0%E0%A7%8D%E0%A6%AD%E0%A6%BF%E0%A6%B8%E0%A7%87%E0%A6%B8-%E0%A6%B8%E0%A6%BE%E0%A6%AB%E0%A6%93%E0%A7%9F%E0%A6%BE%E0%A6%A8-%E0%A6%B8%E0%A7%8B%E0%A6%AC%E0%A6%B9%E0%A6%BE%E0%A6%A8

External links
 Official site

Real estate companies of Bangladesh
Conglomerate companies of Bangladesh
1987 establishments in Bangladesh